The women's 800 metres at the 2015 World Championships in Athletics was held at the Beijing National Stadium on 26, 27 and 29 August.

Summary
Eunice Jepkoech Sum of Kenya entered the competition as the defending champion and also as the world-leading athlete for the season with her time of 1:56.99 minutes.

The third semi-final was the fastest, with Melissa Bishop battling Maryna Arzamasava to the line, leaving defending champion and world #1 Eunice Jepkoech Sum as a time qualifier. Bishop's winning 1:57.52 became the new Canadian National Record.

In the final it was the same three players, Arzamasava holding the lead through the final turn, with Sum looking for a way to run around her.  With Sum moving to the outside, Arzamasava drifted out, opening a gap on the inside which Bishop moved in to occupy.  It was three abreast down the home stretch but Arzamasava never relinquished the lead, Bishop unable to get ahead on the inside and Sum just slightly behind them both.

Records
Prior to the competition, the records were as follows:

Qualification standards

Schedule

Results

Heats
Qualification: First 3 in each heat (Q) and the next 6 fastest (q) advanced to the semifinals.

Semifinals
Qualification: First 2 in each heat (Q) and the next 2 fastest (q) advanced to the final.

Final
The final was started at 14:15

References

800
800 metres at the World Athletics Championships
2015 in women's athletics